This list of fossil sites is a worldwide list of localities known well for the presence of fossils. Some entries in this list are notable for a single, unique find, while others are notable for the large number of fossils found there. Many of the entries in this list are considered Lagerstätten (sedimentary deposits that exhibits extraordinary fossils with exceptional preservation—sometimes including preserved soft tissues). Lagerstätten are indicated by a note in the noteworthiness column.

Fossils may be found either associated with a geological formation or at a single geographic site. Geological formations consist of rock that was deposited during a specific period of time. They usually extend for large areas, and sometimes there are different important sites in which the same formation is exposed. Such sites may have separate entries if they are considered to be more notable than the formation as a whole. In contrast, extensive formations associated with large areas may be equivalently represented at many locations. Such formations may be listed either without a site, with a site or sites that represent the type locality, or with multiple sites of note. When a type locality is listed as the site for a formation with many good outcrops, the site is flagged with a note. When a particular site of note is listed for an extensive fossil-bearing formation, but that site is somehow atypical, it is also flagged with a note.

Many formations are for all practical purposes only studied at a single site, and may not even be named. For example, sites associated with hominin, particularly caves, are frequently not identified with a named geologic formation. Therefore, some sites are listed without an associated formation.

List of sites

Notes

See also

 
 
 
 
 
 
 
 
 Pleistocene fossils in Michigan

References

Further reading
 
 

Sites
Fossil sites
Paleontology lists
Geology-related lists
Lists of places